Arrowhead Game Studios AB is an independent Swedish video game developer, established in 2008 by a group of Luleå University of Technology students studying in Skellefteå.

Their first game, Magicka, won the Game of the Year award at the Swedish Game Awards 2008. In 2011 Magicka was released, published by Paradox Interactive, after a contract with the publisher was signed in 2009.

In the following years, Arrowhead developed The Showdown Effect, a 2.5D multiplayer action game inspired by 1980s and 1990s action movies, for which they stuck with Paradox Interactive to publish it in 2013, and Gauntlet, a co-op dungeon action game, which was published by WB Games in 2014. Their most recent game, Helldivers, was published by Sony Computer Entertainment on PlayStation 3, PlayStation 4, PlayStation Vita, and Microsoft Windows.

As of 2020 the studio employs about 60 people.

Games

Awards 
 Magicka won the Game of the Year award at the Swedish Game Awards 2008.

References

External links 
 

Video game companies established in 2008
Indie video game developers
Video game companies of Sweden